Federation for International FootGolf, also known as FIFG, is the world's governing body for the sport of footgolf. Established in 2012, FIFG organizes FootGolf World Cups, tours and regulates the sports footgolf associations around the world.

Background 
A group of countries combined to form the Federation for International FootGolf in June 2012, and 8 countries played the first FootGolf World Cup in Hungary. The second FootGolf World Cup was held in January 2016 in Argentina and over 230 players from 26 FIFG member countries participated.

On October 3, 2017, the Global Association of International Sports Federations announced the federation as one of the first international federations to achieve Observer status.

Responsibilities 

 Organizes footgolf tours
 Organizes the Footgolf World Cup
 Regulates member countries 
 Set the rules of the sport

Members 

 UK FootGolf Association  
 Austrian Footgolf Association  
 FootGolf Canada
 American Footgolf League  
 New Zealand FootGolf Association

References

International sports organizations
Sports organizations established in 2012